Richard Martin Lloyd Walters (born January 14, 1965), better known as Slick Rick, is an English-American rapper and record producer.

He rose to prominence with Doug E. Fresh & the Get Fresh Crew in the mid-1980s. Their songs "The Show" and "La Di Da Di" are considered early hip hop classics. "La Di Da Di" is one of the most sampled songs in history.

In 1986, Slick Rick became the third artist signed to Def Jam Records.  He has released four albums: The Great Adventures of Slick Rick (1988), The Ruler's Back (1991), Behind Bars (1994) and The Art of Storytelling (1999). His music has been sampled and interpolated over 1,000 times, in dozens of songs by artists, including Eminem, Beyoncé, Mariah Carey, Beastie Boys, TLC, Nas, Miley Cyrus, Kanye West, MF DOOM, CZARFACE, Black Star, The Notorious B.I.G., Snoop Dogg, MC Ren, Montell Jordan, Tech N9ne and Color Me Badd. In the process, Slick Rick has become one of the most-sampled hip-hop artists ever. Many of these songs based on Slick Rick samples went on to become hit singles.

He was one of the very first hip-hop artists to be covered, when Snoop Dogg (then Snoop Doggy Dogg) rapped Rick's lyrics from his record "La Di Da Di" almost in their entirety on the track 'Lodi Dodi' on his debut album Doggystyle in 1993. At the time it was very uncommon for rappers to use complete song lyrics from another artist.

Slick Rick has been a VH-1 Hip Hop Honors honoree, and About.com ranked him  12 on their list of the Top 50 MCs of Our Time, while The Source ranked him No. 15 on their list of the Top 50 Lyricists of All Time. He has acted and cameo-ed in 10 movies and videos.

He makes an appearance as a playable character in the video games Def Jam: Fight for NY and Def Jam Fight for NY: The Takeover.

Early life
Walters was born in the southwest London district of Mitcham to Jamaican parents on 1 Brad Gibson street. He was blinded in the right eye by broken glass as an infant. In 1976, he and his family immigrated to the United States, settling in the Baychester area of the Bronx. At Fiorello H. Laguardia High School of Music & Art, where he majored in visual art, Rick met Dana Dane. The pair became close friends and formed the Kangol Crew, performing in school contests, parks, and small local clubs.

At a 1984 talent showcase he entered, Rick met Doug E. Fresh. Impressed by Rick's talent, Doug made him a member of his Get Fresh Crew (which also included DJs Chill Will and Barry Bee). Doug's beatbox and Rick's fresh flow turned "The Show"/"La Di Da Di" into international anthems that turned rap music on its head and became the launching pad for "Hip Hop's greatest storyteller."

Career

Initial fame
His career began in 1985; Walters first gained success in the rap industry after joining Doug E. Fresh's Get Fresh Crew, using the stage name MC Ricky D. He was featured on the single "The Show" and its even more popular B-side, "La Di Da Di", which featured Walters' rapping over Doug E. Fresh's beatbox.  Both tracks gained some mainstream attention, they appeared on Top of the Pops and Soul Train with the Get Fresh Crew. Reflecting on the single in Rolling Stone magazine, Roots drummer and Tonight Show bandleader Ahmir "Questlove" Thompson said, "Point blank: Slick Rick's voice was the most beautiful thing to happen to hip-hop culture [...] Rick is full of punchlines, wit, melody, cool cadence, confidence and style. He is the blueprint."

In 1986, Slick Rick joined Russell Simmons's Rush Artist Management and became the third artist signed to Def Jam Records, the leading rap/hip-hop label at the time. Collaborating with his friend, DJ Vance Wright, Walters produced his solo debut, The Great Adventures of Slick Rick, which came out in 1988 on Def Jam.  The album was very successful, reaching the No. 1 spot on Billboards R&B/Hip-Hop chart.  It also featured three charting singles: "Children's Story", "Hey Young World", and "Teenage Love". The release is known for its storytelling and vocal characterizations. "With the combination of Rick's Dick Van Dyke-on-dope accent and his unique narrative style, the record was an instant classic," wrote critic Matt Weiner. "Each of Rick's songs was an amusing, enthralling story that lasted from the first groove to the last."

Incarceration and subsequent albums
In 1989, Walters' mother, Veronica, hired his first cousin, Mark Plummer, as his bodyguard. By 1990, Plummer had become a liability, having tried numerous times to extort money from the artist. Plummer was fired and, unsatisfied with his severance package, tried to rob Walters on numerous occasions and also threatened to kill the rapper and his mother. When Walters found bullet holes in his front door, he bought guns for protection. On July 3, 1990, Walters spotted Plummer in his neighborhood, and fired at least four shots. One bullet hit Plummer; another caught a passerby in the foot. Neither suffered life-threatening injuries.

He eventually pleaded guilty to two counts of attempted murder and other charges, including assault, use of a firearm, and criminal possession of a weapon. The rapper called it an act of self-defense. He spent five years in prison, two for the then-second-degree attempted-murder charges he received for the shooting, and three for disputes with the Immigration and Naturalization Services over his residency in the U.S. He was released from prison in 1997.

After being bailed out by Russell Simmons, Walters recorded his second album, The Ruler's Back, released in 1991. Despite peaking at No. 29 on the Billboard Hot 100, the album received mixed reviews and was not as commercially successful as his debut. In the documentary film, The Show, Russell Simmons interviewed Walters while he was imprisoned on Rikers Island.

Walters' third studio album (the fourth for Def Jam) Behind Bars was released in 1994, while he was still incarcerated. It was met with lukewarm sales and reviews. Behind Bars peaked at No. 11 on the Billboard Top R&B/Hip-Hop Albums chart, and No. 51 on the Billboard 200.

Walters remained with the Def Jam label, and on May 25, 1999, released a fourth album, The Art of Storytelling. The Art of Storytelling was a comeback-album that paired him with prolific MCs like Nas, OutKast, Raekwon, and Snoop Dogg. The Los Angeles Times announced it as the "triumphant return of rap's premier yarn-spinner", calling the song "2 Way Street" "a much-needed alternative to rap's misogynistic slant". It charted higher than any of Slick Rick's prior releases: No. 8 on the Billboard 200; and No. 1 on the Top R&B/Hip-Hop Albums chart.

After performing on a Caribbean cruise ship in June 2002, Walters was arrested by the Immigration and Naturalization Service (INS) as he re-entered the United States through Florida. He was promptly told that he was being deported under a law allowing deportation of foreigners convicted of felonies. Rick was continuously refused bail, but after 17 months in prison he was released on November 7, 2003. In October 2006, the Department of Homeland Security began a new attempt to deport Walters back to the United Kingdom, moving the case from the United States Court of Appeals for the Second Circuit based in New York to the more conservative Eleventh Circuit. The court is based in Atlanta, Georgia, but the trial was expected to proceed in Florida, where immigration agents originally arrested Walters.

On May 23, 2008, New York Governor David Paterson granted Slick Rick a full and unconditional pardon on the attempted murder charges. The governor was pleased with his behavior since the attempted murders. Slick Rick volunteered his time to mentor kids about violence.

Later career and life
Walters married his wife Mandy Aragones in April 1997, four years after the couple met at a Manhattan nightclub. The performer has two children from a previous relationship. He and his wife have donated about a dozen items from his collection to the Smithsonian National Museum of African American History and Culture.

Slick Rick and the Soul Rebels Brass Band collaborated on June 21, 2012 in Washington, D.C. at the historic Howard Theatre which re-opened in April 2012.

In addition, Rick was a Mixx Cares Humanitarian Award recipient.

On April 15, 2016, Rick was granted U.S. citizenship, remarking, "I am so proud of this moment—and so honored to finally become an American citizen." He will also retain his UK citizenship.

On November 2, 2018, Rick released the single "Snakes of the World Today". In 2020, Rick featured on Westside Gunn's album Who Made the Sunshine.

Honors
On October 6, 2008, Rick was honored on the VH1 Hip Hop Honors show. In 2018 he was added to the Bronx Walk of Fame.

Rapping style
Slick Rick's style is commended by music critics. Music journalist Peter Shapiro wrote, " 'Children's Story' was important because of its narrative structure and Rick's understanding of how crucial little sonic details—such as his use of a female voice and his yawning rap—were to hip hop style."

He is largely known for his story raps, such as "Children's Story" and "La Di Da Di". Shapiro writes that he "largely introduced the art of narrative into hip hop... none of the spinners of picaresque rhymes who followed did it with the same grace or humor." AllMusic states that he has the "reputation as hip hop's greatest storyteller." In the book Check the Technique, Slick Rick says, "I was never the type to say freestyle raps, I usually tell a story, and to do that well I've always had to work things out beforehand." Kool Moe Dee comments, "Slick Rick raised the lost art of hip hop storytelling to a level never seen again." Devin the Dude notes that Slick Rick's "Indian Girl" is a good example of the type of humor that existed in hip hop's golden era, and Peter Shapiro says that "he was funnier than Rudy Ray Moore or Redd Foxx."

Slick Rick uses very clear enunciation and retains some English pronunciations, which led Shapiro to say that he raps in the "Queen's English". O.C. states: "The Great Adventures of Slick Rick is one of the greatest albums ever... the stuff he was just saying on there, it was so clear.. the [clear] syllable dude was Slick Rick for me". He is also renowned for his unique "smooth, British-tinged flow" which contains distinct structures. In the book How to Rap, it is noted that on the song "I Own America", he "puts a rest on almost every other 1-beat so that each set of two lines begins with a rest." Kool Moe Dee stated that, "Rick accomplished being totally original at a time when most MCs were using very similar cadences." He has what is described as "singsong cadences"; Andy Cat of Ugly Duckling mentions that Slick Rick uses a melodic delivery on the track "Hey Young World". Slick Rick is also known to extensively use punch ins, especially in his story rhymes as different characters; Kool Moe Dee says Rick used "multi-voices to portray multiple characters."

Discography

 The Great Adventures of Slick Rick (1988)
 The Ruler's Back (1991)
 Behind Bars (1994)
 The Art of Storytelling (1999)

See also
Shyne, a New York City rapper sentenced to nine years in prison for shooting and injuring two people, whose family sought a pardon from NY Governor Patterson

References

External links

 
 

1965 births
Living people
People from the Bronx
American male rappers
American rappers of Jamaican descent
American people convicted of assault
American people convicted of attempted murder
Black British male rappers
Rappers from London
English expatriates in the United States
Columbia Records artists
Def Jam Recordings artists
English people convicted of assault
English people of Jamaican descent
Fiorello H. LaGuardia High School alumni
People from South Wimbledon
Rappers from the Bronx
Recipients of American gubernatorial pardons
21st-century American rappers
21st-century American male musicians
African-American male rappers
CTI Records artists
21st-century African-American musicians
20th-century African-American people